Gianluca Toscano (born 13 January 1984) is a former Italian professional footballer who plays for Castrense  in Eccellenza Lazio (amateur league).

Biography

Professional career
Born in Rome, Lazio, Toscano started his professional career with Serie C1 club Sora. In January 2003 he was signed by Ascoli's youth team. In 2003–04 season, he joined A.C. Milan's Primavera team. In January 2004 he was transferred to Serie C2 club Latina.

Non-professional
In 2004, he left for Serie D club Astrea, then left for Cassino. In 2006, he signed a professional contract with Lanciano and released in 2007 due to a serious injury. In 2007–08 season, he was signed by Guidonia then left for Eccellenza Lazio team Pisoniano. In May 2008 he was signed by Serie B team Pisa but released again in August. in 2008–09 season he left for Tor Tre Teste. He scored 30 goals in Eccellenza Lazio as topscorer of Lazio region. In July 2009 he was signed by another Serie B team Grosseto but soon released again. He was offered no.90 shirt for Grosseto. He then left for Fidene and Ostia Mare in December 2009.

In July 2010 he joined Pisoniano.

From June 2013 plays for Castrense

References

External links
 

Italian footballers
Ascoli Calcio 1898 F.C. players
A.C. Milan players
S.S. Virtus Lanciano 1924 players
A.S.D. Cassino Calcio 1924 players
Pisa S.C. players
F.C. Grosseto S.S.D. players
Association football forwards
Footballers from Rome
1984 births
Living people